Gauthier Okawe (born 9 April 1991) is a Gabonese sprinter. He competed in the 100 metres event at the 2013 World Championships in Athletics.

References

External links
 

1991 births
Living people
Gabonese male sprinters
Place of birth missing (living people)
World Athletics Championships athletes for Gabon
21st-century Gabonese people